Warneckea wildeana is a species of plant in the family Melastomataceae. It is found in Cameroon and Gabon.

References

wildeana
Vulnerable plants
Taxonomy articles created by Polbot